Skyview Unit is a Texas Department of Criminal Justice (TDCJ) is a co-gender state prison in Rusk, Texas; it is on Farm to Market Road 2972, west of Texas State Highway 69 North. It opened in July 1988.

It is on a  lot, co-located with the Hodge Unit. It has a capacity of 528 prisoners, most of whom live in dormitories.

The prison houses mentally ill inmates. Prison guards assigned to Skyview take special training to come to this prison.  most prisoners stay for about 20-60 days before returning to a general purpose prison, but some stay long-term. Steve McVicker of the Dallas Observer wrote that at Hodge and Skyview "both guards and prisoners seem more relaxed than their counterparts at other prisons". Unlike most TDCJ prisons Skyview is air conditioned, so the prison administrators turn away prisoners who they suspect are faking mental illnesses.

As of April 2020 there were 479 inmates.

Notable Inmates
• Diane Zamora- Convicted For The Murder Of Adrianne Jones.

References

External links
"Skyview (SV)." Texas Department of Criminal Justice.

Prisons in Texas
Buildings and structures in Cherokee County, Texas
1988 establishments in Texas
Psychiatric prisons